Seven Girlfriends is a 1999 romantic comedy film directed by Paul Lazarus and starring Tim Daly.

Plot

Cast 
Tim Daly .... Jesse Campbell
Laura Leighton .... Anabeth
Mimi Rogers .... Marie
Olivia d'Abo .... Hannah
Melora Hardin .... Laura
Jami Gertz .... Lisa
Katy Selverstone .... Peri
Elizabeth Peña .... Martha
Arye Gross .... Roman

References

External links 

1999 films
1999 romantic comedy films
American romantic comedy films
Films shot in San Francisco
Films scored by Christopher Tyng
1999 directorial debut films
1990s English-language films
1990s American films